City on Fire is a 1987 Hong Kong crime-thriller film directed by Ringo Lam, who also produced with Karl Maka. The film stars Chow Yun-fat, Danny Lee, and Sun Yueh. Following A Better Tomorrow (1986), it 
helped establish Chow's popularity as an action star in Asia, and, to a lesser degree, North America.

Plot

An undercover cop, Chan Kam-wah, who is investigating a group of jewellery thieves, blows his cover and is stabbed to death by three attackers in a street market. His superior, Inspector Lau, orders Ko Chow, another undercover policeman, to resume the investigations. Ko Chow accepts reluctantly because during his previous undercover mission he had to arrest someone who had trusted him as a friend.

The robbers are holding up a jewellery factory, but someone manages to alert the police. One of the robbers, Fu, kills a policeman, starting a firefight with the approaching policemen. The gang barely escapes. The police commissioner sets up a dedicated task force to investigate the gang, under the leadership of the young inspector John Chan. A strong rivalry develops between Lau and Chan; Chan considers Lau old-fashioned and out of his depth, while Lau considers Chan inexperienced and arrogant.

To reach out to the gang, Chow offers them weapons for sale through the middle-man Tai Song. During the first meeting with gang member Fu they are tailed by members of the Criminal Investigation Department under the command of Chan (who is unaware that Chow is an undercover policeman). After the funeral of Chan Kam-wah, Chow meets with Lau who hands him a key to a locker in a bowling alley where the weapons will be stashed. Chow advises against handing out real guns, but Lau insists so as not to lose track of the gang.

Chow meets with his girlfriend Hung, to whom he made a marriage proposal shortly before. When Chow asks her to postpone the marriage until his case is closed, she leaves the room hysterically.

Prior to the handover of the guns, Chow tapes a recorder around his waist. He meets with three of the gang members. Chow is patted down, but manages to distract them from the tape recorder. Fu is satisfied with the sample gun and instructs Chow to meet him again in two days at noon to buy additional guns and ammunition.

The next day Chow meets with Lau and asks him for additional weapons. Lau needs time to get them, but assures Chow he will deposit them two hours before the arranged handover to Fu in the bowling alley. Meanwhile Hung packs her bags to take a flight to Canada with Tso, an older business man who had offered before to leave his wife for her. When Chow learns about that on the telephone, he asks her to marry him immediately to change her mind. Hung tells him to prove he's sincere by showing up at the register office at 10:00 am the next day, but the following day she waits there in vain with her friend Rose.

On his way to the bowling alley, Chow is tailed by policemen. When he realises this (and since having the guns is a crime) he calls Lau. Lau tells him that the policemen are from Chan's department and orders him to proceed while he would sort out the situation with Chan. When talking to Chan he mentions Chow as an informer, but keeps his status as an undercover cop a secret. Chan refuses Lau's request to call off the tail on Chow.

Now on his own, Chow shakes off his police pursuers at an MTR station by boarding a departing train. While getting the bag with the guns, he notices Fu at the bowling alley. As he leaves the building, the police arrive. Chow manages to escape by jumping from a window and is picked up at street level by Fu who's approaching in a car. They drive to the gang's hideout since their leader wants to meet Chow. He offers Chow the chance to participate in an upcoming big holdup.

Fu drives Chow to the airport where he meets Hung, who's about to board a plane to Canada with Tso. Chow tries to change her mind, but is arrested by the police for selling weapons (while Hung boards the plane). At the police station, Chow is beat up and tortured by Chan's men who want to know the buyer of the weapons.  Chan's superior enters the room, orders Chan's men to release Chow and calls Chan and Lau into his office. Lau admits to having given Chow the weapons for the weapons deal, but keeps quiet about Chow being an undercover cop. Since illegal possession of a firearm is a minor offense, Chan proposes that Chow participates in the holdup to catch the robbers red-handed. Lau considers that too much of a risk, but ultimately the police chief orders Chow's participation in the planned robbery.

There are four possible jewelry stores the gang might rob. All have weak security measures, valuable merchandise and are located at busy roads. After the robbery, the gang plans to drive to a hideout in the harbour area where a boat will pick them up the following day. The police is unaware which store will be targeted, but plans to keep several police teams on standby nearby.

On the eve of the robbery, the gang leader orders the participants to gather at an apartment. For security reasons, they need to spend the remaining time before the holdout together and hand in their pagers. Chow writes the address of the hideout on a piece of paper, but is unable to pass it on to his police colleagues. Chow and Fu share a room and talk about their history and future plans – Fu's wife left him and he never saw his son again, to which Chow tells him that his wife also left him and the men become increasingly close. During the night Chow reads a letter from Hung who tells him that she didn't go to Canada with Tso, but is waiting for him in Hawaii.

The next morning the police leadership orders the police teams out of standby since they don't expect the robbery to happen soon any longer. This is a misjudgment, as the gang leader calls his men together and designates the Tai Kong jewellery store as their target. Since the special police teams stood down, the store is only guarded by two plainclothes policemen in a patrol car. The holdup starts when four of the robbers enter the store, draw their guns, and request the jewellery. Fu and Chow wait at the entrance to keep an eye on the street while the gang leader waits in a getaway car. There Chow realises that it was Fu whom eyewitnesses described as the cop killer who started the firefight during the jewellery factory heist.

When the store alarm is triggered, Big Song (one of the robbers) shoots a saleswoman. While they are trying to escape to their cars, the two policemen guarding the store open fire, wounding gang member Bill. One of the getaway cars is stopped by the police. Fu, Chow, Joe, and Big Song need to leave Bill behind under heavy fire. Joe is killed by police while Big Song tries to hot-wire another getaway car. In an audacious maneuver Fu confronts an approaching police car and kills the four policemen inside, although he gets shot into the shoulder. Chow saves Fu's life by killing the policeman who shot at Fu.

Fu, Chow, Big Song, and Bony (the fourth surviving gang member) escape with the stolen car to the hideout at the harbour, where they meet the gang leader who was already awaiting them. Meanwhile, the police find Chow's note with the address of the hideout at the scene of the firefight.

The leader suspects a traitor among the gang since the police arrived too quickly at the crime scene. He incriminates Chow since he only recently joined their ranks. Big Song and Fu defend Chow and a Mexican standoff emerges.

The police arrives and surrounds the hideout with dozens of men. When Chan requests the men to surrender, Big Song shoots at the police. They open fire and kill him. Bony tries to surrender and is shot by the gang leader for cowardice. When the boss also tries to shoot Chow and Fu, they kill him instead. Chow is wounded by a police bullet and realises his injury is fatal. He confesses to Fu that he's a cop and asks for a quick death, but Fu feels unable to kill Chow. While the police storms the hideout and arrest Fu, Chow dies next to him. Lau is furious about his death and smashes a brick on Chan's head (who's already boasting to a superior about his success) and storms off.

Cast

Production
Filming began in Hong Kong in 1986 and concluded around the Christmas season.

Reception
City on Fire has a rating of 91% on Rotten Tomatoes.

Influence
Quentin Tarantino's 1992 film Reservoir Dogs includes several similar key plot elements and scenes, including the Mexican standoff near the end of the film. After critic Jeffrey Dawson noted "in jest, similar elements" in Empire, other publications including Film Threat promoted the observation, and a Michigan film student created a 1995 short film, Who Do You Think You're Fooling?, which mixed dialog and visuals from both movies to demonstrate the similarities. In addition to Reservoir Dogs, critic Matt McAllister notes that one "can equally see the influence of City On Fire - and similar Hong Kong cops-and-robbers movies - on many other Hollywood 'undercover cop' movies such as Point Break."

Chow Yun-fat and Danny Lee appeared together two years later in John Woo's The Killer where again their characters bond together despite being on opposite sides of the law, though there is a role-reversal as Chow plays a hitman while Lee is a cop.

The 2002 Bollywood film Kaante was inspired by both City on Fire and Reservoir Dogs.

References

External links
 
 
 
 An article by Ron Lim on the similarities between City on Fire and Reservoir Dogs
 A review  from hkfilm.net that also outlines the similarities between both movies.

1987 films
1980s crime thriller films 
1980s gang films
1980s heist films
1980s police procedural films
1980s Cantonese-language films
Films about robbery
Films directed by Ringo Lam
Films set in Hong Kong
Gun fu films
Hong Kong New Wave films
Hong Kong crime thriller films
Hong Kong gangster films 
Hong Kong heist films
Police detective films
Triad films
1980s Hong Kong films